An Estonian House is a center of Estonian culture, usually overseas.  Numerous Estonian Houses were set up after the Soviet occupation of Estonia led to tens of thousands of Estonian people fleeing the war and the occupation and settling overseas.

London
On 30 May 2009, the London Estonian House opened Estonian School in London, a volunteer-supported Estonian language school teaching based on Estonian curricula employing fully qualified teachers with teaching experience from Estonian comprehensive and high schools.

New York
New York Estonian House was bought in 1946 by Estonian-Americans. It is located at 243 East 34th Street in the Kips Bay neighborhood on Manhattan. It houses a number of Estonian organizations such as the New York Estonian School, the editorial office of Estonian language newspaper Vaba Eesti Sõna, choruses for men and women and a folk dancing group.

Toronto
The Toronto Estonian House was purchased on April 1, 1960. The house is located at 958 Broadview Avenue, in what was the Chester Public School house, built in 1891. Two additions were built, the first in 1963, when a 400-seat hall was built at the rear of the building, and the second in 1976, when a four-storey facade was constructed. It houses a number of Estonian organizations such as the Toronto Estonian School, the Toronto Estonian scout troop Kalev, the Põhjala Tütred Guides, the Estonian Toronto Credit Union, Heinsoo Insurance, the Estonian Central Council in Canada, choruses for men and women and a folk dancing group, and the Estonian Consulate in Toronto.

Sydney
Sydney Estonian House was the first house built by Estonians outside of Estonia. The Estonian Society of Sydney held its first Annual General Meeting under its own roof on 14 September 1940. Sydney Eesti Maja houses many cultural groups such as Lõke and Kooskõlas Choir, Virmalised, Rebased and Rukkiklilled Folk Dancing Groups, Mudilasring children's playgroup, Kunsti-käsitöö ja Etnograafiaring and formerly Meie Kodu, the Australian-Estonian newsletter. The house holds many events throughout the year and is one of several located in Australia, others located in Adelaide, Melbourne and Thirlmere 'vanadekodu' (NSW)

The Estonian society “Eesti Kodu” [Estonian Home] was established on 17 April 1925, at the instigation of Mr Jakob Lukats. Two years later, some members of “Eesti Kodu”, wanting greater emphasis on cultural activities, decided to form a parallel society, “Linda”, which was established on 19 June 1927. Less than three months passed, before the two societies decided to merge, forming the Estonian Society of Sydney (Sydney Eesti Selts “Eesti Kodu Linda”) on 9 October 1927.

References

External links
 New York Estonian House
 Toronto Estonian House
 Chicago Estonian House
 Adelaide Estonian House
 Baltimore Estonian House
 Lakewood Estonian House
 London Estonian House
 Leicester Estonian House
 Los Angeles Estonian House
 Stockholm Estonian House
 Tallinn Estonian House
 Estonian Houses in Australia
 A list of Estonian Houses maintained by Tallinn Estonian House

Estonian culture
Estonian diaspora